
Gmina Słońsk is a rural gmina (administrative district) in Sulęcin County, Lubusz Voivodeship, in western Poland.

Villages
Gmina Słońsk contains the villages and settlements of Budzigniew, Chartów, Głuchowo, Grodzisk, Jamno, Lemierzyce, Lubomierzycko, Ownice, Polne, Przyborów and Słońsk.

Neighbouring gminas
Gmina Słońsk is bordered by the town of Kostrzyn nad Odrą and by the gminas of Górzyca, Krzeszyce, Ośno Lubuskie and Witnica.

Twin towns – sister cities

Gmina Słońsk is twinned with:
 Amt Schlaubetal, Germany

References

Slonsk
Sulęcin County